Super Singer T20 (சூப்பர் சிங்கர் T20) is a 2012-2015 Indian Tamil-language reality television singing competition, which aired on Star Vijay. Former contestants from previous seasons of the Super Singer and Airtel Super Singer Junior shows were divided into 6 teams. 15 league matches were held where each team competed against the other five teams. 4 teams were selected for the knockout semi-finals, before the remaining 2 teams competed against each other in the finals. The show was hosted by Divyadarshini.

Airtel Super Singer T20
The show was powered by Bharti Airtel.

Teams

Innisai Indians (team colour: black) ("II") 
The Innisai Indians team was captained by Airtel Super Singer 1 winner, Nikhil Mathew.

The contestants selected as members of the Innisai Indian team were:

Symphony Super Kings (team colour: yellow) ("SSK") 
The Symphony Super Kings team was captained by Airtel Super Singer 3 winner, Saicharan.

Harmony Heart Breakers (team colour: green) ("HHB") 
The Harmony Heart Breakers team was captained by Airtel Super Singer (season 3) finalist, Pooja Vaidyanath.

Rhythmic Royals (team colour: white) ("RR") 
The Rhythmic Royals team was captained by Airtel Super Singer 3 finalist, Srinivas Raghunathan.

Chennai Rock Stars (team colour: red) ("CRS") 
The Chennai Rock Stars team was captained by Airtel Super Singer (season 3) second runner up, Santhosh Hariharan.

Blue Strings (team colour: blue) ("BS") 
The Blue Strings team was captained by Airtel Super Singer (season 3) first runner up, Sathyaprakash.

Matches

League matches

Semifinals 
Symphony super kings vs Innisai Indians and harmony heart breakers vs rhythmic royals.

Symphony superkings and harmony heart breakers qualified to the finals.

Finals 
 Special Hosts: Ma Ka Pa Anand and Divyadarshini
 Special Judge: Sadhana Sargam 
 Other Judges: Ananth Vaidyanathan, Malgudi Shubha, Mano, Vijay Yesudas, Vijay Prakash, Karthik, Suchitra Karthik Kumar, Madhushree

The finals consisted of a competitive match between Saisharan's Symphony Super Kings team and Pooja's Harmony Heartbreakers team.

With 1318 points, the team Symphony Super Kings team captained by Saisharan was crowned the winner of season 1 of the competition.

A celebration round was also broadcast in the week following the finals and prior to the commencement of season 3 of Airtel Super Singer Junior.

Super Singer T20 season 2
Season 2 of the show was powered by AVR Swarna Mahal Jewellery & PRAN Litchi Drink. Bharti Airtel did not return as sponsors of the show.

Show format 
Each match consisted of a competition between two of the teams for the season. A match could be telecast over two or three episodes, and would require the teams to perform songs of a particular pre-selected theme.

Prior to the commencement of a match, a coin is tossed. The team who wins the coin toss will elect whether to perform first or second. The team's captains also would select in advance which performance from their team they believed was a jackpot performance.

Various solo and duet performances are given during each match, sometimes accompanied by other team members providing sound effects or chorus portions. The match concludes after the teams complete their group performances. Performances are scored after each category of performance is complete. The team who accumulates the highest score from each performance wins the match.

Each team competes against each other before the four top-scoring teams move through to the semi finals, while the two lowest-scoring teams are eliminated. Two teams eventually move to the finals.

Teams

White Devils (team colour: white) 
The White Devils team was captained by Airtel Super Singer (season 3) winner, Saisharan, and co-captained by Airtel Super Singer (season 4) runner up, Syed Subahan and season 3 finalist, Deepak.

Dangaamaari (team colour: black) 
The Dangamaari team was captained by Airtel Super Singer (season 4) winner, Diwakar, and co-captained by Airtel Super Singer (season 4) grand finalist, Sonia.

The Octaves (team colour: red) 
The Octaves team was captained by Airtel Super Singer (season 3) international finalist, Pravin, and co-captained by Airtel Super Singer (season 3) contestant Koushik.

Varuthapadatha Padagar (team colour: yellow) 
The Varuthapadatha Padagar team was captained by Airtel Super Singer (season 1) winner, Nikhil Mathew, and co-captained by Airtel Super Singer (season 3) finalist Srinivas.

Sangeetha Sarevedi (team colour: green) 
The Sangeetha Sarevedi team was captained by Airtel Super Singer (season 3) runner-up, Sathyaprakash, and co-captained by Airtel Super Singer (season 3) finalist Pooja Vaidyanath.

The Loud Speakers (team colour: blue) 
The Loud Speakers team was captained by Airtel Super Singer (season 2) & Airtel Super Singer (season 3) finalist, Santosh Hariharan, and co-captained by Airtel Super Singer (season 3) finalist Malavika.

Matches 
Viewers were excited on hearing the news of the show returning for a second season, but expressed their disappointment with season 2 replacement host, rude commentary, as well as the presentation of the competition in the first few weeks.

League matches 
Despite the initial negative reception, performances during the league matches which were memorable for viewers included:

Semifinals 
Four teams qualified for the semi-finals:

 White Devils vs Dangaamaari (Black) - won by White Devils.
 The Red Octaves vs The Loud Speakers (Blue) - won by Loud Speakers.

The non-group performances in the semi-finals unusually featured a medley of two songs at a time (instead of sticking to the preferred one-song format). Memorable performances for viewers included:

Finals 
 Special Host: Ma Ka Pa Anand
 Special Guest Musician: Rajhesh Vaidhya (veena)
 Special Judges: Sunitha Sarathy, S. P. Charan, and Shweta Mohan
 Other Judges: Karthik, Ananth Vaidyanathan, James Vasanthan, and Shalini

The finals consisted of a competitive match between the White Devils team, captained by season 1 winning captain Saisharan, and the Loud Speakers team captained by Santosh Hariharan. The teams were required to deliver performances across three genres during the week - being Carnatic classical music genre, western music genre, and folk music genre.

With the return of TV anchor-turned-popular actor Ma Ka Pa Anand as a special host, electric veena exponent Rajhesh Vaidhya as a special guest musician, and noteworthy comments from special judges Sunitha Sarathy & S. P. Charan, viewers responded positively to the finals which were telecast on Vijay TV from 18 May 2015.

The outcome of the finals was announced in the episode aired on 22 May 2015, and was well received by viewers. Saisharan's "White Devils" team was crowned the title winner of the competition after delivering outstanding performances during the finals and throughout the competition. Prize money was awarded to both teams, courtesy of the show's sponsors, with the winning team receiving 3 lakh rupees, and the runner up team receiving 2 lakh rupees.

See also
 Super Singer
 Super Singer Junior

References 

Star Vijay original programming
2012 Tamil-language television series debuts
2012 Tamil-language television seasons
2015 Tamil-language television seasons
Tamil-language singing talent shows
Tamil-language reality television series
Tamil-language television shows
Television shows set in Tamil Nadu
+
2015 Tamil-language television series endings